is a retired Japanese track and field sprinter and Japan's fourth-fastest record holder of 100m sprint with a time of 10.00 seconds. He held the 100 metres Japanese national record between December 1998 and September 2017.
He is a former Asian record holder in the 100 metres and 200 metres, and still holds the indoor record as well as the 4×400 metres relay record.

He is married to former long-distance runner Hiromi Suzuki.

Career
He started out as a 400 metres runner and after winning a bronze at the 1991 Asian Athletics Championships, he was selected for the relay at the 1991 World Championships in Athletics and represented his country on home turf. In 1993 he won a bronze medal at the 1993 East Asian Games and the 1993 Asian Athletics Championships. He managed to reach the quarter-finals of the 200 m of the World Championships that year. His 1994 was highlighted by a silver medal at his first Asian Games in Hiroshima.

He represented Japan at the 1996 Atlanta Olympics and managed to reach the semifinals of the 200 m and helped the 4×400 m relay to secure fifth place in the final in an Asian record time. He won his first major championship title in 1997, winning the 200 m gold at the East Asian Games, but he did not get past the heat stages at either the IAAF World Indoor Championships or the World Championships in Athletics.

The following year marked his career peak: he started with a win in the 200 m at the 1998 Asian Athletics Championships and went on to win a sprint double at the 1998 Asian Games in Games record times. In winning the Asian Games 100 m crown on 13 December 1998 (Bangkok) he ran a time of 10.00 seconds, during a semi-final heat.  This time had been Japanese national record for 19 years until Yoshihide Kiryū shaving 0.02 off in 2017. He was the Most Valuable Player of the 13th Asian Games.

Ito also clocked a personal best of 20.16 s in the 200 m on 2 October 1998 at Kumamoto, Japan. He put in a strong performance at the 1999 World Indoor Championships, just missing out on the 60 metres final and running an Asian indoor record time for fifth place in the 200 m competition. At the 2000 Sydney Olympics, Ito finished seventh in the semi-finals in both the 100 m and 200 m events (10.39 s and 20.67 s respectively) ; the Japanese men's 4x100 m team (Nobuharu Asahara, Koji Ito, Shigeyuki Kojima, Shingo Suetsugu) finished sixth in 38.66 s. Suetsugu later went on to follow in Ito's footsteps as Japan's top male sprinter. Ito never again matched the form of his high-water-mark 1998 season and retired in 2002.

Achievements

References

External links

1970 births
Living people
Sportspeople from Kobe
Japanese male sprinters
Olympic athletes of Japan
Athletes (track and field) at the 1996 Summer Olympics
Athletes (track and field) at the 2000 Summer Olympics
Asian Games gold medalists for Japan
Asian Games silver medalists for Japan
Asian Games medalists in athletics (track and field)
Athletes (track and field) at the 1994 Asian Games
Athletes (track and field) at the 1998 Asian Games
Medalists at the 1994 Asian Games
Medalists at the 1998 Asian Games
World Athletics Championships athletes for Japan
Japan Championships in Athletics winners
Fujitsu people
20th-century Japanese people
21st-century Japanese people